Mystere  may refer to:

 Mystere (Everquest character), a fictional character in the role-playing game Everquest
 Mystere (Full Moon o Sagashite), a fictional character in the manga series Full Moon o Sagashite

See also

 Mystère (disambiguation)